The Heaton, later Henniker-Heaton Baronetcy, of Mundarrah Towers in Sydney in Australia, is a title in the Baronetage of the United Kingdom. It was created on 31 January 1912 for the Conservative politician and postal reformer John Henniker Heaton. The second Baronet assumed the additional surname of Henniker.

Heaton, later Henniker-Heaton baronets, of Mundarrah Towers (1912)
Sir John Henniker Heaton, 1st Baronet (1848–1914)
Sir John Henniker-Heaton, 2nd Baronet (1877–1963)
Sir (John Victor) Peregrine Henniker-Heaton, 3rd Baronet (1903–1971)
Sir Yvo Robert Henniker-Heaton, 4th Baronet (born 1954)

References
Kidd, Charles, Williamson, David (editors). Debrett's Peerage and Baronetage (1990 edition). New York: St Martin's Press, 1990.

Henniker-Heaton